Ižište is a village in the municipality of Makedonski Brod, North Macedonia.

Demographics
According to the 2002 census, the village had a total of 63 inhabitants. Ethnic groups in the village include:

Turks 53
Macedonians 10

References

External links

Villages in Makedonski Brod Municipality